Jerry Lynn (born 1963), is a professional wrestler.

Jerry Lynn may also refer to:

 Jerry Lynn (baseball) (1916–1972), Major League Baseball second baseman

See also
 Jerry Lin, professor
 Gerry Lynn, Australian rules footballer
 Gerry Lynn (politician) (1952–2020), American politician
 Jeremy Lin, basketball player
 Jeremy Linn, swimmer
 Jerry Lynn Ross (born 1948), United States Air Force officer
 Jerry Lynn Williams, composer
 Jerry Lynn Young (born 1942), bank robber
 Jerry Lyne, basketball coach